The following is a list of highways in Portugal. The Portuguese highway system is well spread out over the country. As well as the following roads it includes many national 2 lane roads.

Autoestrada (motorway/freeway)

Itinerário principal (principal itinerary)

Itinerário complementar (complementary itinerary)

Estrada nacional (national road)

Estrada regional (regional road)

Estrada municipal (municipal road)
Highways
Portugal
Roads in Portugal
Highways